Marica Bodrožić (born 1973) is a German writer of Croatian descent. She moved to Germany as a child and currently lives in Berlin.

Bodrožić writes primarily in the German language. She is fluent in multiple genres, including essays, novels, poems, and stories. She has worked as a literary translator and a teacher of creative writing. One of her best known works is the novel Kirschholz und alte Gefühle (A Cherrywood Table) which received the EU Prize for Literature. The novel has been translated into Italian by Stefano Zangrando for Mimesis (2017).

In 2017, Marica Bodrožić signed the Declaration on the Common Language of the Croats, Serbs, Bosniaks and Montenegrins.

Works

Italian translations

Awards
Bodrožić's awards include: 
 2013 Kranichsteiner Literaturpreis
 2015 European Union Prize for Literature
 2015 Literaturpreis der Konrad-Adenauer-Stiftung
 2021 
 2022 , Dresden

Memberships
 PEN Centre Germany

References

Further reading

External links
 

1973 births
Living people
Croatian women writers
20th-century German women writers
20th-century Croatian women writers
21st-century German women writers
21st-century Croatian women writers
20th-century German writers
20th-century Croatian writers
21st-century German writers
21st-century Croatian writers
Signatories of the Declaration on the Common Language